The G-23 is a group of 23 Indian members of parliament that are in the Indian National Congress party and that wrote a letter asking for stronger leadership.

List of G-23 members

References 

Indian National Congress breakaway groups
2022 in Indian politics